Transcendental Highway is the fifth studio album by Scottish-Australian singer Colin Hay, released in 1998.

Track listing
All songs written by Colin Hay except where noted:

"Transcendental Highway" (Dale, Hay) – 5:49
"Don't Believe You Anymore" (Dale, Hay) – 3:56
"My Brilliant Feat" (Hay, Colin Talbot) – 5:48
"Goodbye My Red Rose" – 3:32
"If I Go" (Dale, Hay, Bobby Z.) – 4:27
"I'm Doing Fine" – 4:59
"Wash It All Away" (Dale, Hay) – 3:24
"Cactus" – 4:43
"Death Row Conversation" – 4:55
"I'll Leave the Light On" – 4:39
"Freedom Calling" – 5:05
"I Just Don't Think I'll Ever Get Over You" – 5:19
"You Hold On to Me [Demo] – 2:04 (hidden track)

Personnel
Colin Hay – acoustic guitar, bass, piano, electric guitar, vocals, e-bow, baritone guitar
Dave Dale – percussion, cymbals, drums, electric guitar, background vocals, chamberlin, tape effects
Chad Fischer – percussion, concertina, cymbals, drums, electric guitar, background vocals
Glen Holmen – bass
Ethan Johns – harmonium
Robbie Kilgore – organ, piano, keyboards
Dan Rothchild – bass
Lynne Davis – bass
Martin Tillman – cello

Production
Producers: Colin Hay, Dave Dale
Engineers: Colin Hay, Dave Dale
Mixing: Colin Hay, Dave Dale
Mastering: Gavin Lurssen
Drum programming: Dave Dale
Loops: Dave Dale

References

Colin Hay albums
1998 albums